This article is a list of Russian federal subjects by gross regional product (GRP).

GRP lists
For easy comparison, GRP figures are listed in rubles (RUB) and Euro (EUR), converted according to the exchange rate. All GRP figures in rubles are from the State Statistics of Russian Federation.

Notes
 Annual Average Exchange: According to UN country historical GDP DATA, Russian GDP was RUB 21,625,372 million or US$764,568 million in 2005, the average exchange rate is RUB 28.2844 per USD; GDP 2007 was RUB 33,258,143 million or US$1,300,119 million, the average exchange rate is RUB 25.5808 per USD in 2007; GDP 2008 was RUB 41,444,667 million or US$1,667,600 million, the average exchange rate is RUB 24.8529 per USD in 2008; GDP 2015 was RUB 65,166,840 million or US$1,326,000 million, the average exchange rate is RUB 61.3400 per USD in 2015. Average rate of 55 rubles per 1 dollar.

All years

Notes
 Annual Average Exchange: According to UN country historical GDP DATA, Russian GDP was RUB 21,625,372 millions or US$764,568 million in 2005, the average exchange rate is RUB 28.2844 per USD; GDP 2007 was RUB 33,258,143 million or US$1,300,119 million, the average exchange rate is RUB 25.5808 per USD in 2007; GDP 2008 was RUB 41,444,667 million or US$1,667,600 million, the average exchange rate is RUB 24.8529 per USD in 2008; GDP 2015 was RUB 65,166,840 million or US$1,326,000 million, the average exchange rate is RUB 61.3400 per USD in 2015.

Per capita

Gross regional product per capita at purchasing power parity in US dollars.

See also 
 List of federal subjects of Russia by GDP per capita
 List of Russian federal districts by GDP

References

External links 
 Gross Regional Product by federal subjects of Russian Federation for 1998-2007  
 Gross regional product by region, Russian Federation (gross value added at basic prices) 1998-2009

Russia, GDP
GDP
Russian federal subjects
GRP